Tituzeynal (also Romanized as Tītūzeynal) is a village in Asfyj Rural District, Asfyj District, Behabad County, Yazd Province, Iran. At the 2006 census, its population was 25, in 5 families.

References 

Populated places in Behabad County